Strabomantis ingeri, or Inger's robber frog, is a species of frog in the family Strabomantidae. It is found on the eastern and western slopes of the Cordillera Oriental, Colombia (Cundinamarca, Santander, and Norte de Santander Departments). Its altitudinal range is  asl. It might also occur in adjacent Venezuela. It is named after Robert F. Inger, an American zoologist from the Field Museum of Natural History.

The species' natural habitat is leaf-litter in cloud forest; it can occur in disturbed areas provided that small patches of forest remain nearby. It is threatened by habitat loss caused by logging and agricultural development.

References

External links
 

ingeri
Amphibians of the Andes
Amphibians of Colombia
Endemic fauna of Colombia
Taxa named by Doris Mable Cochran
Taxonomy articles created by Polbot
Amphibians described in 1961